Oakville is a suburb of the City of Hawkesbury, in the state of New South Wales, Australia. Oakville is located 49 kilometres north-west of the Sydney central business district in the local government area of the City of Hawkesbury.

Education 

Arndell Anglican College
Oakville Public School

Landmarks

Scheyville National Park
Killarney Chain of Ponds
McKenzies Creek

Pop culture 
Clare House, a building on Clare Crescent in Oakville, is famous for its use as the "Wandin Valley Bush Nursing Hospital" in the long running Channel 7 television series A Country Practice (1981–1993).

References

Suburbs of Sydney
City of Hawkesbury